Heed was a Swedish heavy metal band founded in 2004 by ex-Lost Horizon members Daniel Heiman (vocals) and Fredrik Olsson (guitar). They were joined by drummer Mats Karlsson and bass player Jörgen Olsson, and began recording on their debut album The Call. It was released in Japan on October 21, 2005 and in Europe on 14 June 2006.

When The Call was completed, Jörgen and Mats left Heed because their musical visions and goals collided with those of the founding members. Fredrik and Daniel started looking for new members and  soon found Tommy Larsson (bass) and Ufuk Demir (drums). They also added a second guitarist, Martin Andersson.

Band members

 Daniel Heiman – vocals
 Fredrik Olsson – guitars
 Martin Andersson – guitars
 Tommy Larsson – bass
 Ufuk Demir – drums

Former members

 Jörgen Olsson – bass
 Mats Karlsson – drums

Discography

 The Call (2006)

External links 
 Heed at the Encyclopaedia Metallum
 Interview with Daniel Heiman

Swedish power metal musical groups
Musical groups established in 2004
Musical groups disestablished in 2008